The Penang State Museum and Art Gallery is a museum and art gallery in George Town,  Penang, Malaysia.

History
The museum building used to house the Penang Free School in 1821–1927. After Penang Free School moved to a new building in Green Lane, the Hutchings School took over the building in January 1928 and used it until 1960. The museum was opened by Yang di-Pertua Negeri of Penang Raja Uda Raja Muhammad on April 14, 1965. The building was declared a heritage building under the 2005 Heritage Act.

In April 2017, major renovation works started at the museum. It is estimated that the RM20million restoration project will take three years; during which the museum's artifacts are to be temporarily moved to the museum's branch at Macalister Road, George Town.  A new building is also planned to be erected on a piece of land next to the museum that has been vacant since it was bombed during World War II.

Operating hours
Penang State Museum (Farquhar Street)
Temporarily Closed due to Restoration

No. 57, Macalister Road
Temporarily Closed due to Maintenance

State Art Gallery (Dewan Sri Pinang)
Opens from Saturday to Tuesday from 10.00 am to 4.00 pm
due to Covid-19

See also
 List of museums in Malaysia

References

External links 

 Penang Museum and Art Gallery - Homepage
 

Museums in Penang
Buildings and structures in George Town, Penang
Art museums and galleries in Malaysia
1965 establishments in Malaysia
Tourist attractions in George Town, Penang